Kinalmeaky is a barony in County Cork, Republic of Ireland.

Etymology

Kinalmeaky takes its name from Cenél-mBéice, Irish for "the kindred of Béce," an ancestor of the O'Mahonys.

Geography

Kinalmeaky is located in south-central County Cork, on the Bandon River.

History

Kinalmeaky was anciently a territory of the Ó Mathghamhna (O'Mahoney), chief of Ui Eachach Mumhan. The rebellion of Conoghor Ó Mathghamhna led to the confiscation of Kinalmeaky in 1580 after the Second Desmond Rebellion, and it was sold to Richard Grenville. In 1628 the territory was used for the title of Viscount Boyle of Kinalmeaky. In the 17th century, it was described as "wild, overgrown and encumbered with woods and bogs."

List of settlements

Below is a list of settlements in Kinalmeaky:

Bandon
Desertserges

See also
List of townlands of the barony of Kinalmeaky

References

Baronies of County Cork